Lorenzo LaVonne Neal (born December 27, 1970) is an American former professional football player who was a fullback in the National Football League (NFL) for sixteen seasons.  Neal played college football for the Fresno State Bulldogs.  He was drafted by the New Orleans Saints in the fourth round of the 1993 NFL Draft.  A four-time Pro Bowl selection and three-time All-Pro, he was also a member of the New York Jets, Tampa Bay Buccaneers, Tennessee Titans, Cincinnati Bengals, San Diego Chargers, Baltimore Ravens, and Oakland Raiders.  Considered one of the best blocking fullbacks in NFL history, Neal blocked for a 1,000+ yard running back in eleven straight seasons from 1997 to 2007.

Early years
Neal attended Lemoore High School in Lemoore, California and was a letterman in football and wrestling. He set many rushing records for the Tigers football team with over 2,000 yards in rushing in a season, which would later be broken by Nick Sula. In wrestling, he won a state championship as a senior. Neal still owns the California state record for fastest pin in a match.

College career
Neal originally signed with Arizona in February 1989, but didn't qualify academically and was denied admission. He then enrolled at Fresno State University that August, where he played for the Fresno State Bulldogs football team from 1989 to 1992. During his four college seasons, he rushed for 2,405 yards. He was an All-Big West selection his junior and senior seasons.
Neal finished his career as the school’s second-leading rusher with 2,405 yards and played in the Japan Bowl All-Star Game. He defeated a sumo wrestler in an exhibition match in Japan during the Japan Bowl. He graduated with a degree in criminal justice.

In 1991, he ran for 837 yards and 8 touchdowns.  In 1992, he ran for 988 yards and 10 touchdowns.

Professional career

New Orleans Saints
Neal was selected in the fourth round (89th overall) of the 1993 NFL Draft by the New Orleans Saints.

Neal, as a halfback made his NFL debut on September 5, against the Houston Oilers and led the team in rushing with 13 carries for 89 yards, it was his first of two starts as a rookie. Just seven days later, he suffered a season-ending ankle injury during a road game against the Atlanta Falcons. Then on September 15, he was placed on Injured Reserve, ending his season. He was later told he would not be able to run as he had before, so his coaches proposed the idea that he be switched to fullback.

Then in 1994, he set career high with 30 carries for 90 yards and one touchdown. In 1995, he caught a career-long 69-yard touchdown pass during a road game against the New England Patriots on December 3. In 1996, he set career highs with 31 receptions for 194 receiving yards in his last season with the Saints.

New York Jets
In 1997, Neal signed with the New York Jets, on March 31. In his one season with the team, he helped running back Adrian Murrell rush for 1,086 yards.

Tampa Bay Buccaneers
On March 12, 1998, Neal was traded to the Tampa Bay Buccaneers for a fifth-round pick. In his season in Tampa Bay, he helped Warrick Dunn rush for 1,026 yards. He was then released by the Buccaneers on February 11, 1999.

Tennessee Titans
On March 23, 1999, Neal signed with the Tennessee Titans. During his first season with the team, he helped Eddie George rush for 1,304 yards in the regular season, and two 100-yard games in the playoffs. Neal fielded the kick of the "Music City Miracle" against the Buffalo Bills, where he handed it off to Frank Wycheck, who would throw the game winning lateral to Kevin Dyson. Neal and the Titans would appear in Super Bowl XXXIV against the St. Louis Rams, losing 23-16. He was also selected to USA Today’s All-Joe team.

In 2000, Neal helped George rush for 1,509 yards and 14 touchdowns. Neal was named the "NFL's Best Blocking Fullback" by the Sporting News. He was also named to Sports Illustrated'''s midseason All-Pro team. He was also named a Pro Bowl third-alternate. He was released by the Titans on March 1, 2001.

Cincinnati Bengals
After two seasons with the Titans, and one Super Bowl appearance, Neal signed with the Cincinnati Bengals on May 8, 2001, where in his first season with the team, he helped Corey Dillon rush for 1,315 yards. After the season, Neal was named to USA Today's All-Joe team. He was also selected as a Pro Bowl second-alternate.

In 2002, Neal helped Dillon rush for 1,311 yards. He also recorded a one-yard touchdown reception, against his former team, the Tennessee Titans on October 27. He also was selected to his first Pro Bowl.

San Diego Chargers
On March 3, 2003, Neal signed with the San Diego Chargers and began the longest stint of his career, with one team, five seasons. During his first season blocking for LaDainian Tomlinson, he helped him rush for 1,645 yards and the team to rush for a total of 2,146 yards. Tomlinson became Neal's fifth 1,000 yard rusher he blocked for. He scored his first touchdown of the season on a three-yard run on the road against the Oakland Raiders on September 28. He also carried the ball three times for seven yards in short yardage situations against the Baltimore Ravens on September 21, all three of which resulted in first downs. He recorded a season-high seven carries for 22 yards on the road against the Cleveland Browns on October 19. For the season, he was named to USA Todays All-Joe team, as well as a Pro Bowl First-alternate.

In 2004, Neal helped Tomlinson rush for 1,335 yards and the Chargers rush for 2,185 yards as total. Neal also recorded a 12-yard kickoff return against his former team, the Tampa Bay Buccaneers on December 12. He was also named Chargers Alumni Player of Week after rushing four times for season-high 16 yards on the road against the Browns on December 19. He was, once again, named to USA Today'''s All-Joe team. He was also, named a Pro Bowl first-alternate, once again.

The 2005 season began with an historic moment in Neal's career, he played in his 200th career game, in the season opener against the Dallas Cowboys. A game in which he recorded three carries on short yardage plays, all resulting in first downs. For the season he was named a Pro Bowl starter. He was also named to the "All-Interview" team by NFL.com. On October 28, 2005, he signed a two-year contract extension through 2007.

In 2006, Neal helped Tomlinson and Michael Turner record 194-rushing yards for the September 11 season opening 27–0 win in Oakland. The Chargers scored two rushing touchdowns, one by Tomlinson and one by Turner. Neal helped block for a 241-rushing yard performance against the Titans in a 40–7 Week 2 win, which included two Tomlinson rushing touchdowns. On October 15, during a road game against the San Francisco 49ers, Neal helped Tomlinson tie a team record and set a career-high with four rushing touchdowns. In the Chargers 35–27 win over the Browns on November 5, Neal played in his 200th-consecutive game and helped the Chargers rush for 190 yards and three touchdowns. During November 19, 35–27 Chargers win, he helped Tomlinson rush for 105 yards and three touchdowns, which put Tomlinson over 1,000 yards for season, marking the 10th-straight year Neal was the lead blocker for a 1,000-yard rusher. He scored his first touchdown of the season against the Denver Broncos on December 10, on four-yard trick play run called the “Bumarooski” late in first quarter, it was his first rushing touchdown since September 28, 2003 at Oakland and gave the Chargers a 14–0 lead. He also threw a key block on Kansas City Chiefs Linebacker Kendrell Bell that helped Tomlinson run for a career-long 85-yard touchdown on December 17, it was the third-longest run in team history. Neal also helped contribute to the Chargers recording 265 rushing yards, fifth-most in team history. He was named to his third Pro Bowl and was a First-team All-Pro selection by the Associated Press, USA Today, Sports Weekly and ESPN.com.

In 2007, Neal had his streak of 221 consecutive games played come to an end when he was inactive for Week 14 against the Detroit Lions, while he recovered from a broken leg suffered the previous week against the Titans; he had not missed a game since 1994. Against the Chiefs, he helped Tomlinson surpass 1,000 yards, marking the 11th-straight season as the lead blocker for a 1,000 yard rusher. Neal recorded a touchdown reception on a fourth-and-goal play in Week 2 on the road against the New England Patriots, (his first touchdown reception since 2005). He was named to his fourth Pro Bowl and was named First-team All-Pro by the Associated Press and All-NFL by USA Today and Sports Weekly. On February 28, 2008, Neal was waived by San Diego.

Baltimore Ravens
On August 12, 2008, the Baltimore Ravens signed Neal to a one-year contract.

Neal played in his first game with the Ravens Week one against the Bengals, when he served as the back-up to Le'Ron McClain and helped the Ravens rush for 229 yards and recorded one reception for 13 yards. During Week 2, he carried the ball once for two yards and helped the Ravens hold the ball for 13:18 in the fourth quarter against the Browns. During Week 5, on the road against the Indianapolis Colts he subbed for McClain and helped protect rookie quarterback Joe Flacco, allowing him to set career-highs with a 73.7% completion and 241 passing yards. During Week 8 in Cleveland, Neal subbed for McClain and helped the Ravens rush for a season high 193 yards in the 37–27 victory. He also carried the ball once for two yards. In Week 10 (at the New York Giants), Neal started his first game as a Raven and helped protect Joe Flacco, allowing him to complete 60.6% of his passes and holding the Giants to just one sack.

Oakland Raiders
Neal was signed by the Oakland Raiders on May 8, 2009. He was waived/injured on August 19 to make room for safety Rashad Baker and subsequently reverted to injured reserve. He was released by the Raiders with an injury settlement on August 26. He was expected to push Oren O'Neal and Luke Lawton for the starting fullback job. In September 2009, Neal was selected to the Sporting News Magazines Team of the Decade for the 2000s.

NFL statistics
Rushing Statistics

Personal life
Neal and wife Denisha have one son, Lorenzo Jr., and twin daughters, Nylya and Mia. Lorenzo Jr. player college football at Purdue. After going undrafted in the NFL draft, Lorenzo Jr. was signed by the New Orleans Saints but was waived in August 2021. The Denver Broncos claimed Lorenzo Jr. off of waivers but he was waived during final roster cuts.

Podcast
Neal and Ray Oldhafer, long time cohort of Adam Carolla, started the NFL Podcast "Ray and Lorenzo" under Carolla Digital, which was launched on September 6, 2013.

In 2018 Bleav podcast network launched a Chargers oriented podcast called "Bleav in Chargers". Since 2020 Lorenzo has hosted the podcast with Chargers beat writer Fernando Ramirez, who joined Lorenzo in February 2021.

Radio career
Neal was a co-host on the morning show Mornings with Joe, Lo, and Dibs on San Francisco radio station 95.7 The Game until 2020. He is now a guest/substitute host at the station.

References

External links
Official Website
New York Jets bio
Oakland Raiders bio

1970 births
Living people
Sportspeople from Fresno, California
Players of American football from California
African-American players of American football
American football fullbacks
Fresno State Bulldogs football players
New Orleans Saints players
New York Jets players
Tampa Bay Buccaneers players
Tennessee Titans players
Cincinnati Bengals players
San Diego Chargers players
Baltimore Ravens players
Oakland Raiders players
American Conference Pro Bowl players
People from Hanford, California
People from Lemoore, California
21st-century African-American sportspeople
20th-century African-American sportspeople